Fida Mohammad Khan is a Pakistani politician who has been a Member of the Senate of Pakistan, since March 2018.

Political career
Khan was elected to the Senate of Pakistan as a candidate of Pakistan Tehreek-e-Insaf on general seat from Khyber Pakhtunkhwa in 2018 Pakistani Senate election. He took oath as Senator on 12 March 2018.

References

Living people
Pakistan Tehreek-e-Insaf politicians
Members of the Senate of Pakistan
Year of birth missing (living people)